The Battle of Praga or the Second Battle of Warsaw of 1794 was a Russian assault on Praga, the easternmost community of Warsaw, during the Kościuszko Uprising in 1794. It was followed by a massacre (known as the Massacre of Praga) of the civilian population of Praga.

Eve of the battle
After the Battle of Maciejowice, General Tadeusz Kościuszko was captured by Russians. The internal struggle for power in Warsaw and the demoralisation of the city's population prevented General Józef Zajączek from finishing the fortifications surrounding the city both from the east and from the west. At the same time, the Russians were making their way towards the city.

Opposing forces
The Russian forces consisted of two battle-hardened corps under Generals Aleksandr Suvorov and Ivan Fersen. Suvorov took part in the recent Russo-Turkish war, then in the heavy fighting in Polesie and finally in the Battle of Maciejowice. Fersen fought for several months in Poland but was also joined by fresh reinforcements sent from Russia. Each of them had approximately 11,000 men.

The Polish-Lithuanian forces consisted of a variety of troops. Apart from the rallied remnants of the Kościuszko's army defeated in the Battle of Maciejowice, it also included a large number of untrained militia from Warsaw, Praga and Vilnius, a 500-man Jewish regiment of Berek Joselewicz as well as a number of scythemen and civilians. The forces were organised in three separate lines, each covering a different part of Praga. The central area was commanded directly by General Józef Zajączek, the northern area was commanded by Jakub Jasiński and the southern by Władysław Jabłonowski. Altogether, Warsaw was defended by 30,000 men and had 104 cannons. Suvorov came to the walls of Praga with 16,000 troops and 86 cannons.

Battle
The Russian forces reached the outskirts of Warsaw on 3 November 1794. Immediately upon arrival, they started an artillery barrage of the Polish-Lithuanian defences. This made Józef Zajączek think that the opposing forces were preparing for a long siege. However, Suvorov's plan assumed a fast and concentrated assault on the defences rather than a bloody and lengthy siege.

At 3 o'clock in the morning of November 4, the Russian troops silently reached the positions just outside the outer rim of the field fortifications and two hours later started an all-out assault. The defenders were completely surprised and soon the defence lines were broken into several isolated pockets of resistance, bombarded by the Russians with canister shots with a devastating effect. General Zajączek was slightly wounded and retreated from his post, leaving the remainder of his forces without command. This made the Poles and Lithuanians retreat towards the centre of Praga and then towards Vistula.

The heavy fighting lasted for four hours and resulted in a complete defeat of the Polish-Lithuanian forces. Joselewicz survived, being severely wounded, but almost all of his command was annihilated; Jasiński was killed fighting bravely on the front line. Only a small part managed to evade encirclement and retreated to the other side of the river across a bridge; hundreds of soldiers and civilians fell from a bridge and drowned in the process.

Massacre

After the battle ended, the Russian troops, against the orders given by Suvorov before the battle, started to loot and burn the entire borough of Warsaw in revenge for the slaughter of the Russian Garrison in Warsaw during the Warsaw Uprising in April 1794, when about 2,000 Russian soldiers died. Faddey Bulgarin recalled the words of General Ivan von Klugen, who took part in the Battle of Praga, "We were being shot at from the windows of houses and the roofs, and our soldiers were breaking into the houses and killing all who happened to get in the way… In every living being our embittered soldiers saw the murderer of our men during the uprising in Warsaw… It cost a lot of effort for the Russian officers to save these poor people from the revenge of our soldiers… At four o'clock the terrible revenge for the slaughter of our men in Warsaw was complete!" Almost all of the area was pillaged and inhabitants of the Praga district were tortured, raped and murdered. The exact death toll of that day remains unknown, but it is estimated that up to 20,000 people were killed. Suvorov himself wrote: "The whole of Praga was strewn with dead bodies, blood was flowing in streams." It was thought that unruly Cossack troops were partly to blame for the uncontrolled destruction. Some Russian historians claim that Suvorov tried to stop the massacre by ordering the destruction of the bridge to Warsaw over the Vistula river with the purpose of preventing the spread of violence to Warsaw, although others dispute this, pointing out to purely military considerations of this move, such as to stop Polish and Lithuanian troops stationing on the left bank from attacking Russian soldiers.

After the battle
After the battle the commanders of Warsaw and large part of its inhabitants became demoralised. To spare Warsaw the fate of its eastern suburb, General Tomasz Wawrzecki decided to withdraw his remaining forces southwards and on November 5. Warsaw was captured by the Russians with little or no opposition. It is said that after the battle General Aleksandr Suvorov sent a report to Catherine the Great consisting of only four words: Hooray! Warsaw is ours! The Empress of Russia replied equally briefly: Bravo Fieldmarshal, Catherine, promoting him to Field Marshal for this victory. The massacre of Praga dented Suvorov and the Russian army's reputation throughout Europe.

National historiographies 
Russian writers and historians have tried to either justify or present this massacre as an revenge for Polish conquest of Moscow in 1612 or the heavy losses Russian garrison sustained during the Warsaw Uprising of 1794. Such reasoning was immortalized after 1831 when Russians once again crushed a Polish uprising (the November Uprising) against Russia's occupation of Poland; shortly afterward Alexander Pushkin compared the Praga massacre with the events of events of 1612: "Once, you celebrated the shame of Kreml, tsar's enslavement. But so did we crushed infants on Praga's ruins". Similar sentiments can be seen in the poetry of Vasily Zhukovsky and Gavrila Derzhavin or plays of Mikhail Kheraskov and Michail Glinka. On the other hand Polish literature and historiography has a tendency to be biased in the other direction, dwelling on the description of Russian cruelty and barbarism.

Similar arguments were used by Russian historians Pyotr Chaadayev,  and even Aleksandr Solzhenitsyn, and can be seen repeated in the Soviet-era reference works as the Great Soviet Encyclopedia. After the Second World War this entire event, like many other cases of Russo-Polish conflicts, was a taboo topic in the Soviet Bloc, where Soviet propaganda now tried to create an illusion of eternal Slavic unity and friendship. Any references to the massacre of Praga were eliminated from textbooks, existing academic references were restricted and censored, and further research was strongly discouraged. Although after the fall of communism the restrictions to research were lifted, this is still one of the controversial and sensitive topic in the Polish-Russian relations.

See also
List of massacres in Poland

References and notes
a  The Polish term for the massacre, rzeź Pragi, more literally translates as Slaughter of Praga, but most English sources translate it as "massacre".

External links
04.11.1794. Battle of Praga, Suvorov's Corps OOB
The hand-written sketch map of storm of Praga, suburb of Warsaw. 1794.
 4 listopada 1794 r. O jeden most za mało, Gazeta Wyborcza, 2007-11-06

1794 in the Polish–Lithuanian Commonwealth
1794 in the Russian Empire
Praga
Alexander Suvorov
Anti-Polish sentiment in Europe
Praga
Praga
Imperial Russian war crimes
Massacres in Poland
Praga